Lehnitz (in German Bahnhof Lehnitz) is a railway station in the district of Lehnitz, Oranienburg, Germany. It is served by route S1 of the Berlin S-Bahn, with trains in both directions stopping every 20 min during the hours of operation.

Location
It is in fare zone Berlin C of Verkehrsverbund Berlin-Brandenburg.

History
The passenger-only station was opened on 10 April 1878. On 4 October 1925 an electric S-Bahn train reached the station for the first time. While south of Birkenwerder station the tracks for suburban and long-distance traffic were separate, both services shared the tracks north of it, and thus also in Lehnitz station. One track of the line was lifted after 1945 for war reparations. After it was relaid, suburban and long-distance traffic each used a separate track. Since only S-Bahn trains stopped in Lehnitz, the eastern platform was therefore not used from 1964.

Work started in 1977 to upgrade the line to four tracks. A new bridge across the Oder Havel Canal was built north of Lehnitz station which was completely renewed. The tracks were moved west, and the new station, southwest of the old one, was opened in March 1980. The S-Bahn trains originally used only the western track, and the long-distance trains passed the eastern side of the platform without stopping. The new long-distance tracks east of the platform were taken into service in April 1989, and S-Bahn trains have used both sides of the platform since then.

Buildings and engineering works
The original station was situated at ground level and had two side platforms and a small station building. The new station was built on an embankment and has an island platform which is accessed at its northern end by stairs from a foot tunnel, and at its southern end by a barrier-free ramp. The latter access route crossed the western S-Bahn track and is protected by crossing gates. The old station building was dismantled in 1981/1982, and no traces remain of it and the former gated level crossing.

External links
 Station information

References

Berlin S-Bahn stations
Railway stations in Brandenburg
Oranienburg
Buildings and structures in Oberhavel
Railway stations in Germany opened in 1878